"Girls" is a short story written by Mrinal Pande.  It was first published in the Hindi weekly Dharmyug in 1983, and in English language translation in the weekly Manushi in the same year.

Plot
"Girls" is told from the viewpoint of an eight-year-old girl, and highlights how Indian society takes women for granted and conditions them to accept a secondary role in the family. It also shows that many a times, women themselves are the one's who consider women inferior. In the story, the narrator's father has been shown as a kind man. He wants his daughters to get educated and become something in their lives. The narrator's mother, Lali, has three daughters and is expecting a fourth child, fervently hoping that it is a boy so that she will be rid of the nuisance of going through another pregnancy. Lali, the narrator and her sisters go to Nani's (maternal grandmother's) house for the last months of pregnancy. Throughout the stay there, the narrator notices how the members of the house consider women inferior, and is fed up of the elders' hypocrisy. There occur many incidents that keep remind the narrator of a girl's subjugative position in orthodox Indian society. Only the grandson is allowed to sit on Nani's lap whereas the girls are sent away. Nani and all the elders of the house pray to the family goddess that the baby born be a son so as to uphold the 'family honor'. The narrator overhears her aunt complaining in whispers to her mother of the problems she has to endure as a woman. Such incidents leave a lasting impact on the already insecure mind of the narrator, who is curious to know why the elders consider women and girls to be inferior. Her innocent curiosity greatly angers Lali, Nani and the others. Bari, the narrator's elder sister, advises her not to ask the elders such questions.
Then comes the holy day when kanyakumaris or young girls are to be worshipped as goddesses. Nani, who earlier shows herself to be a woman who agrees that women are inferior, now calls her granddaughters lovingly to partake of the prasad and participate in the rituals. The elders' hypocrisy shocks the narrator and is too much for her to bear. She bursts into tears, shouting angrily that if they did not love girls, why did they pretend to worship them?
To know more read the book"Treasure Trove of short stories".

References

Indian short stories